Les Fredaines de Pierrette [Pierrette's Escapades],  or  Arrivée de Pierrette et Pierrot, is a 1900 French silent film directed by Alice Guy. The film was produced by the Gaumont Film Company.

Synopsis
The film opens with a woman in a pink dress taking off a fluffy white hat and coat. She sits to powder herself. An all-white Pierrot edges into the frame from the right. The woman stands up to gesture to the camera. Pierrot intervenes. They gesture at each other. Pierrot tries to dance and kiss the woman, but she mocks and rebuffs Pierrot. More gestures ensue, then Pierrot leaves. The woman faces and gestures more towards the camera, then primps herself in front of the mirror. She then mimes looking and listening for someone or something to the right of the frame, then pulls up the sides of her dress to dance. There is a jump cut in which a female Harlequin in a green body suit with a fluffy collar and a yellow bicorne hat and boots appears. The woman and Harlequin perform a pas de deux and end the dance and the film with a kiss.

Description
This is a fragment of an unidentified music hall number or ballet. Part of the film is hand colored using stencils.

References

External links

 Online restored version of the film
 This is a three DVD set; disc 1 contains Pierrette's escapades = Fredaines de Pierette (1900)

1900 films
Articles containing video clips
French black-and-white films
French silent short films
1900s French films